The 2019 Indy Eleven season is the club's sixth season of existence, their sixth consecutive season in the second tier of American soccer, and their second season in the league now named the USL Championship. The season covers the period from October 21, 2018 to the beginning of the 2020 USL Championship season.

Roster

Non-competitive

Preseason
The Eleven released their preseason schedule on January 23, 2019. A four-game preseason slate was initially announced, featuring matches against teams from Major League Soccer, the USL Championship, USL League One, and one collegiate program. A fifth game, against Forward Madison FC, was later added to the schedule.

Midseason

Competitive

USL Championship

Standings

Results by round

Match results
The league announced home openers for every club on December 14, 2018. Indy will open at Lucas Oil Stadium on March 30, meeting expansion club Hartford Athletic for the first time. The Eleven will also take part in the home openers for two other clubs, facing Saint Louis FC on March 9 and Charlotte Independence on March 15.

The full Indy schedule was released on December 19, 2018. The season will once again consist of 34 matches, with the Eleven playing home and away against each Eastern Conference opponent. Indy will face expansion clubs Birmingham Legion FC, Hartford Athletic, Loudoun United FC, and Memphis 901 FC for the first time ever, and will also play inaugural matches against Saint Louis FC and Swope Park Rangers, who move over from the Western Conference.

USL Cup Playoffs

U.S. Open Cup

As a member of the USL Championship, Indy Eleven will enter the tournament in the Second Round, to be played May 14–15, 2019.

Statistics

Appearances and goals

|-
|colspan=10 align=center|Players who left Indy during the season:

|}

Disciplinary record

Clean sheets

Transfers

In

Loan in

Out

Loan out

Awards

USLC Team of the Week

USLC Player of the Week

Kits

See also
 Indy Eleven
 2019 in American soccer
 2019 USL Championship season

References

Indy Eleven seasons
Indy Eleven
Indy Eleven
Indy Eleven